Robert Kurtzman (born November 25, 1964) is an American film director, producer, screenwriter, and special effects makeup artist.

Career 
Kurtzman began his career in 1984 when he moved from his hometown of Crestline, Ohio, to Hollywood, California, to pursue his interest in prosthetic makeup, better known as special makeup effects. In 1988, along with Gregory Nicotero and Howard Berger, he formed K.N.B. EFX Group, a special makeup effects studio which has gone on to work on over 400 film and television projects. K.N.B. has won numerous awards, including an Emmy Award in 2001 for their work on the 2000 Sci Fi Channel miniseries Frank Herbert's Dune. They were awarded an Academy Award in 2006 for achievement in makeup for The Chronicles of Narnia: The Lion, the Witch and the Wardrobe.

After establishing himself in the special effects arena, Kurtzman turned to directing and producing. His first project was From Dusk till Dawn, for which he wrote the original story, served as co-producer, and created the special effects. The Demolitionist marked Kurtzman's directorial debut. He went on to direct Wishmaster, in which he had an uncredited cameo as "piano wire guy". In 2002, Kurtzman left K.N.B. EFX Group. Kurtzman moved his family to Crestline, Ohio, and started his own production company, Precinct 13 Entertainment. Founded in 2003, Precinct 13 is described as a Film/Television and Radio Commercial/Visual Effects production facility. The Rage was the first in-house, fully financed, independent feature film. Kurtzman and P13 have, also, co-produced the supernatural film The Dead Matter, featuring Andrew Divoff, Tom Savini, and Jim O'Rear. Kurtzman also directed the action-thriller film Deadly Impact, which was written by Alexander Vesha.
In 2017, Kurtzman took on the Makeup/ MUFX Co-Department Head position for the series The Haunting of Hill House directed by Mike Flanagan. Kurtzman moved his studio to Atlanta and formed Robert Kurtzman MUFX, LLC. His new company has worked on films such as Jay and Silent Bob Reboot, Ma and Doctor Sleep.

Awards 
 Sitges - Catalan International Film Festival – 2002 Winner for Best Makeup for Cabin Fever. Shared with Howard Berger and Gregory Nicotero.
Academy of Science Fiction, Fantasy & Horror Films – 1999 Saturn Award winner for Best Makeup for Vampires. Shared with Howard Berger and Gregory Nicotero.
 Sitges – Catalan International Film Festival – 1997 nominee for Best Film for Wishmaster.
CableACE Awards – 1995 nominee for Makeup for State of Emergency (1994) (TV). Shared with Howard Berger, Gregory Nicotero, Ashlee Petersen, and Heidi Seeholzer.
 CableACE Awards – 1994 nominee for Makeup for Body Bags (1993). Shared with Rick Baker, Greg LaCava, Gregory Nicotero, and Howard Berger.

Filmography

1980s 

 From Beyond (1986) - Effects Technician
 Night of the Creeps (1986) – Special makeup effects
 A Nightmare on Elm Street 3: Dream Warriors (1987) – Freddy's creature forms
 Predator (1987) – Creature effects crew
 Evil Dead II (1987) – Special makeup effects unit crew
 Phantasm II (1988) – Special makeup effects constructor

 976-EVIL (1988) - on-set makeup applicator: Kevin Yagher Production, Inc.
 Halloween 5: The Revenge of Michael Myers (1989) – Special effects supervisor: K.N.B. EFX Group
 A Nightmare on Elm Street 5: The Dream Child (1989) – Supervisor: Freddy's head de-merge effects, special makeup effects artist
 The Horror Show (1989) – Special effects
 DeepStar Six (1989) – Creature guy
 Night Angel (1989) – Additional makeup effects supervisor: K.N.B. EFX Group
 Nightwish (1989) – Special effects

 Intruder (1989) – Special makeup effects artist

1990s 
 Dances with Wolves (1990) – Buffalo effects supervisor
 Bride of Re-Animator (1990) – Special makeup effects and bride effects creator: K.N.B. EFX Group, special makeup effects artist
 Tremors (1990) – Creature effects: art crew

 The Exorcist III (1990) - Demon effects makeup
 Darkman (1990) - Special effects makeup artist
 Misery (1990) – Special makeup effects artist
 Sibling Rivalry (1990) – Special makeup effects
 Tales from the Darkside: The Movie (1990) – Special makeup effects supervisor
 Leatherface: The Texas Chainsaw Massacre III (1990) – Makeup artist

 The People Under the Stairs (1991) – Special makeup effects supervisor
 Dr. Giggles (1992) – Special makeup effects supervisor
 Army of Darkness (1992) – Special makeup effects supervisor: K.N.B. EFX Group
 The Nutt House (1992) – Special makeup effects

 Jason Goes to Hell: The Final Friday (1993) – Effects supervisor: K.N.B. EFX Group, special makeup effects artist: K.N.B. EFX Group
 Body Bags (1993) (TV) – Special makeup effects
 Doppelganger (1993) – Special makeup effects
 Maniac Cop 3: Badge of Silence (1993) – Special makeup effects supervisor
 Ed and His Dead Mother (1993) – Special makeup effects

 Wes Craven's New Nightmare (1994) – Special makeup effects
 Pumpkinhead II: Blood Wings (1994) – Special makeup effects supervisor
 John Carpenter's In the Mouth of Madness (1994) – Special makeup effects
 The Demolitionist (1995) – Director, screenwriter
 Lord of Illusions (1995) – Special makeup effects supervisor: K.N.B. EFX Group
 Skinner (1995) – Special makeup effects artist, special effects supervisor

 Wes Craven's Vampire in Brooklyn (1995) – On-set special makeup effects application, special makeup effects: puppeteer
 Galaxis (1995) – Special makeup effects supervisor
 Scream (1996) – Special makeup effects supervisor
 From Dusk till Dawn (1996) – Co-producer, story, makeup effects supervisor
 The Night Flier (1997) – Special makeup effects supervisor
 Double Tap (1997) – Special makeup effects supervisor
 Spawn (1997) – Animatronic creature effects, special makeup effects
 Wishmaster (1997) – Director, special makeup effects

 The Faculty (1998) – Special makeup and creature effects
 A Simple Plan (1998) – Special makeup effects supervisor/puppeteer
 John Carpenter's Vampires (1998) – Special makeup effects
 Dean Koontz's Phantoms (1998) – Makeup effects supervisor: KNB EFX Group
 House On Haunted Hill (1999) - Special makeup effects

2000s 
 The Crow: Salvation (2000) - Special makeup effects artist
 Frank Herbert's Dune (2000) – Animatronic creature effects supervisor/puppeteer
 Little Nicky (2000) – Special makeup and creature effects supervisor
 Spiders (2000) – Special makeup and creature effects supervisor
 My First Mister (2001) – Co-executive producer, special makeup effects artist
 Vanilla Sky (2001) – Special makeup effects supervisor: K.N.B. EFX Group Inc.
 Thir13en Ghosts (2001) – Special makeup effects artist, special makeup effects supervisor
 John Carpenter's Ghosts of Mars (2001) – Special makeup effects artist
 Soulkeeper (2001) – Special makeup and creature effects
 Evolution (2001) – Creature effects
 John Carpenter's Vampires: Los Muertos (2002) – Special makeup effects supervisor
 Bubba Ho-tep (2002) – Special makeup effects supervisor
 Cabin Fever (2002) – Special makeup effects supervisor
 Ghost Ship (2002) - Additional prosthetic special makeup effects supervisor artist/hairstylist
 Bad Boys II (2003) - Special makeup effects artist (uncredited)
 Identity (2003) – Special makeup effects supervisor
 Tremors 4: The Legend Begins (2004) – Special effects supervisor
 Cursed (2005) - Special makeup effects
 Hostel (2005) – Visual effects supervisor
 Jolly Roger: Massacre at Cutter's Cove (2005) – Visual effects supervisor
 2001 Maniacs (2005) – Visual effects supervisor
 The Devil's Rejects (2005) – Visual effects supervisor
 The Texas Chainsaw Massacre: The Beginning (2006) - Special effects makeup
 The Rage (2007) – Producer, director, writer, cinematographer, visual effects producer, special makeup effects producer
 Buried Alive (2007) – Director, visual effects producer, special makeup effects producer, special effects director
 Wanted: Undead or Alive (2007 – filming) – Special Makeup FX Producer/Visual effects producer
 The Living Hell (2007) – Visual effects producer, special makeup effects producer
 Deadly Impact (2009) - Director, special makeup producer, visual effects producer, actor (character: Homeowner)

2010s 
 The Dead Matter (2010) – Producer
 Jug Face (2013) – Special makeup effects producer
 Tusk (2014) – Special effects makeup
 Lake Eerie (2016) – Special makeup effects artist, special effects supervisor
 The Funhouse Massacre (2016) – Special makeup effects producer
 The Neighbor (2016) – Special makeup effects supervisor
 The Bye Bye Man (2017) – Special makeup effects producer
The Haunting of Hill House (TV series) - Co-Makeup/Makeup Effects Department Head
Stephen King's Gerald's Game (film) - Makeup Effects Department Head
Doctor Sleep (2019 film) - Makeup Effects Department Head

2020s 
 Rise of The Living Dead (2021) – Special makeup effects artist
Cherry (2021 film) - Makeup/Makeup Effects Department Head
 The Underground Railroad (2021) TV series – makeup artist (1 episode)
 Black Friday (2021) – Makeup and Special Effects Department Head
Fear Street Part Two: 1978 - Makeup Effects Artist
First Kill (TV series) - Makeup Effects Department Head
Secret Headquarters - Makeup Effects Department Head
The Last Days of Ptolemy Grey - Makeup Effects Department Head
 KillRoy Was Here  (2022) – Special makeup effects artist

References

External links

1964 births
American male screenwriters
American make-up artists
Horror film directors
Living people
People from Crestline, Ohio
Special effects people
Animatronic engineers
Screenwriters from Ohio
Film producers from Ohio